The province of Livorno or, traditionally, province of Leghorn is a province in the Tuscany region of Italy. It includes several islands of the Tuscan Archipelago, including Elba and Capraia. Its capital is the city of Livorno. When formed in 1861, the province included only Livorno and Elba Island. It was extended in 1925 with land from the provinces of Pisa and Genoa. There are 19 comuni (singular: comune) in the province. The coastline of the area is known as "Costa degli Etruschi" (Etruscan Coast).

The province of Livorno is coastal and contains a number of coastal towns. Livorno is a highly important port for tourism and trading, and a number of watchtowers are located nearby the city. At Calafuria, the sea contains sponges, shellfish, fish, and protected red coral (Corallium rubrum). The coastlines of Quercianella and Castiglioncello are rocky. The waters around the province of Livorno sometimes contain dolphins. The town Marina di Bibbona was initially founded as a fort due to its strategic coastal position. Town San Vincenzo contains a fourteenth-century tower for strategic reasons. The sand of Golfo di Baratti is silver and black due to its high iron concentration, and the area contains an archaeological park.

Subdivisions

Comuni
The province is subdivided into 19 comuni (singular: comune). This is the complete list of comuni in the province of Livorno:

 Bibbona
 Campiglia Marittima
 Campo nell'Elba
 Capoliveri
 Capraia Isola
 Castagneto Carducci
 Cecina
 Collesalvetti
 Livorno
 Marciana
 Marciana Marina
 Piombino
 Porto Azzurro
 Portoferraio
 Rio
 Rosignano Marittimo
 San Vincenzo
 Sassetta
 Suvereto

At 30 April 2014, the main comuni by population are:

Government

List of presidents of the province of Livorno

References

External links

Official website  
Livorno Tourist Board Site  

 
L
Livorno